Samuel Ball may refer to:

 Samuel Ball (educator) (1935–2009), Australian educator
 Samuel George Ball (1884–1969), Australian rugby league administrator
 Sam Ball (born 1944), American football player
 Sam Ball (filmmaker), American documentary film producer